Eilema karenkona is a moth of the subfamily Arctiinae. It was described by Shōnen Matsumura in 1927. It is found in Japan.

References

karenkona
Moths described in 1927